Nosophora maculalis is a moth in the family Crambidae. It was described by John Henry Leech in 1889. It is found in Japan, the Russian Far East and China.

References

Moths described in 1889
Spilomelinae
Moths of Asia